Arthur Louis Schmidt (May 1, 1927 - Sep 2, 2018) was an American politician in the state of Kentucky. He served in the Kentucky Senate and in the Kentucky House of Representatives. He was a member of the Republican party. He died on Sep 2, 2018 at the age of 91.

References

1927 births
2018 deaths
Republican Party members of the Kentucky House of Representatives
Republican Party Kentucky state senators
Kentucky politicians convicted of crimes